Margir Deh (also Romanized as Mārgīr Deh) is a village in Kheyrud Kenar Rural District, in the Central District of Nowshahr County, Mazandaran Province, Iran. At the 2006 census, its population was 401, in 101 families.

References 

Populated places in Nowshahr County